Cantharellus roseocanus is a species of fungus in the family Cantharellaceae. Found in the Pacific Northwest region of North America, it was originally described in 1997 as a variety of Cantharellus cibarius, and later promoted to distinct species status in 2012.

References

External links

roseocanus
Fungi described in 1997
Fungi of North America